Jesse Everett Warren (August 16, 1914 – April 8, 2003) was an American Negro league third baseman who played in the 1940s.

A native of Whitehaven, Tennessee, Warren made his Negro leagues debut in 1940 for the Kansas City Monarchs and Memphis Red Sox. He went on to play for several teams, finishing his career back with Memphis in 1948. Warren died in 2003 at age 88.

References

External links
 and Seamheads

1914 births
2003 deaths
Birmingham Black Barons players
Chicago American Giants players
Kansas City Monarchs players
Memphis Red Sox players
St. Louis–New Orleans Stars players
Baseball players from Memphis, Tennessee
Baseball third basemen